The 1966 FA Charity Shield was a Merseyside derby between Liverpool and Everton at Goodison Park. Liverpool won the Football League and Everton won the 1966 FA Cup Final to qualify for the charity shield. Before the game, Roger Hunt, Alan Ball and Ray Wilson paraded the World Cup, the FA Cup and the Football League Trophy around Goodison Park.
Liverpool won the game with a goal from Roger Hunt in the ninth minute of the first half.

Match details

See also
1965–66 Football League
1965–66 FA Cup

References

1966
Charity Shield 1966
Charity Shield 1966
Charity Shield
Charity Shield 1966
FA Charity Shield